The oblique vein of the left atrium (oblique vein of Marshall) is a small vein which descends obliquely on the back of the left atrium and ends in the coronary sinus near its left extremity; it is continuous above with the ligament of the left vena cava (vestigial fold of Marshall), and the two structures form the remnant of the left Cuvierian duct. This obscure region of cardiac perfusion adjacent to the SA node rocks back and forth under systole and diastole thus further influencing cardiac autonomic innervation. Ablation of this channel seems reasonable to many observers.

Additional images

References

Veins of the torso